Clover Lea is a historic home located near Mechanicsville, Hanover County, Virginia. It was built in 1845–1846, and is a two-story, three bay, side-hall-plan brick dwelling in the Greek Revival style.  The house features a two-story, Tuscan order-inspired portico which consists of six massive square wooden columns supported by brick piers.  Also on the property is a contributing small carriage barn.

It was listed on the National Register of Historic Places in 1979.

References

Houses on the National Register of Historic Places in Virginia
Greek Revival houses in Virginia
Houses completed in 1846
Houses in Hanover County, Virginia
National Register of Historic Places in Hanover County, Virginia